Cophocetus is an extinct genus of baleen whale known from Miocene-aged marine strata in Oregon, North America.

See also
 Paleontology in Oregon

References

Miocene cetaceans
Miocene mammals of North America
Miocene genus extinctions
Prehistoric cetacean genera
Fossil taxa described in 1934